Engine Software (formerly MSX-Engine) is a Dutch video game developer, located in Doetinchem, Netherlands, which specialized in handheld video games and digital platforms until 2011. In the period after (2011-present) they have become more active and known for high-end ports and adaptations of games to modern consoles, mobile, PC and streaming services like Stadia and Luna. Some of the best known games they have worked on include Puzzle Quest for the Nintendo DS, Terraria for PlayStation 3, PlayStation 4, PlayStation Vita, Xbox 360, Xbox One and Wii U, Killer7 Remastered for PC, Ni No Kuni: Wrath of the White Witch for Nintendo Switch and No More Heroes / No More Heroes 2 for Nintendo Switch.

In 2020 Engine Software announced they are working with Ubisoft to rerelease Scott Pilgrim vs The World: The Game, and also working with NIS America to release ports for Nintendo Switch and PC of Japanese developer Nihon Falcom's flagship titles Ys IX and Trails of Cold Steel IV.

History

Early years (1995–2004) 
Engine Software BV was founded in 1995 by several friends who met and worked together previously in the active Dutch demo scene for the MSX home computer. In this period (1989-1993) the group (named MSX-Engine ) released three indie games, a disk magazine, a music tracker and an Assembler. In 1994 some of the people from MSX-Engine started working on a game for the Super NES, and the name was changed to Engine Software later the same year. In 1995 the group officially founded the company, making it the oldest (still active) game developer in The Netherlands. The game for SNES, Corn Buster, was unreleased after a publishing deal with Sunsoft fell through.

After this, Engine Software was asked by fellow game developer Vicarious Visions to support them in the development of several Game Boy Color games for clients like THQ  and Vatical Entertainment. The relation between Vicarious Visions and Engine Software lasted another generation of handheld consoles, the Game Boy Advance, releasing games such as Powerrangers: Timeforce  and SpyMuppets: License to Croak. Soon after the companies each went their own way.

Nintendo DS era (2005–2012) 
In terms of sheer quantity this was Engine Software's most productive period, with 51 Nintendo DS titles released. Following their supporting developer role with Vicarious Visions earlier, Engine Software worked in the same role with 1st Playable Productions and Artificial Mind and Movement (rebranded back to Behaviour Interactive in 2010) on a wide range of Nintendo DS games based on licensed properties from Disney and Nickelodeon. At the same time the studio launched more games of its own design like Just Sing! and Lost Identities. With German publisher DTP Young Entertainment they developed a range of educational games for the German Market called "Think Kids" (licensed from Ravensburger), and they also signed a multi-game development deal with Belgian production house Studio 100 based on their TV properties (Mega Mindy, Maya the Bee, K3).

Dutch publisher Playlogic Entertainment NV, which purchased a minority share in Engine Software in 2003 invested in an original concept by the studio for PlayStation Portable called Stateshift. After a year in development Playlogic cancelled the development, and in early 2007 Engine Software bought back the shares from Playlogic Entertainment. The game Stateshift for PlayStation Portable was independently finished by Engine Software and published by Midas Interactive in Europe and Conspiracy Entertainment in the United States. Engine Software and Playlogic still collaborated on two Nintendo DS games after this: Dragonhunters in 2008 and Aliens in the Attic in 2009. During this time Engine Software also formed a relationship with Milan-based publisher 505 Games due to their penchant of creating games based on licensed materials. With 505 Games, Engine Software released movie-based games Cats & Dogs 2: The Revenge of Kitty Galore and HOP: THe Video Game.

Multi-platform era (2012–2020)
Around 2012 most work-for-hire licensed games work had dried up, and Engine Software rebranded itself as a multi-platform developer specializing in ports and adaptations of a wide area of games, from indie titles to triple-A titles. The first project was a multi-year multi-platform collaboration with 505 Games and Re-Logic to bring the smash-hit Terraria from PC to consoles, starting with PlayStation 3 and Xbox 360 in 2013 and later that year to PlayStation Vita. These releases were followed by versions of Terraria for PlayStation 4 and Xbox One in 2014, and finally a Wii U version 2016. During this time Engine Software and Re-Logic also collaborated on the concept and design for a Terraria spin-off title called Terraria: Otherworld which Re-Logic announced in 2015. Otherworld's development had some significant issues and delays causing Re-Logic to move development of the title to a different studio in 2017.

Games developed

Middleware
The Engine Software Music Replayer'' is a piece of music sequencer middleware, developed by Engine Software. It was developed for use on the Game Boy Advance, and later reproduced in a version for use on the Nintendo DS. It was licensed to many other developers for both platforms.

Key staff
Engine Software is run by Ivo Wubbels (CEO) and Ruud van de Moosdijk (VP Development), both founders of the company in 1995. Other key figures within the company include Senior producer Jeroen Schmitz also one of the founders of the company, Lead Technology programmer Jan-Lieuwe Koopmans who created the Music Replayer, and composer Bart Roijmans who scored almost all of Engine Software's games.

References

External links
 

Video game development companies
Video game companies of the Netherlands
Companies based in Gelderland
Doetinchem
Video game companies established in 1995
Dutch companies established in 1995